Ormiston Endeavour Academy (formerly Thurleston High School) is a secondary school with academy status located in Ipswich in the English county of Suffolk.

The school is sponsored by the Ormiston Academies Trust.

References

External links
Ormiston Endeavour Academy homepage

Secondary schools in Suffolk
Academies in Suffolk
Ormiston Academies
Schools in Ipswich